The Godavari Bridge or Kovvur–Rajahmundry Bridge is a truss bridge spanning the Godavari River in Rajahmundry, India. It is India's third longest road-cum-rail bridge crossing a water body, the first one being the Bogibeel Bridge, also a rail-cum-road bridge over the Brahmaputra River in the Dibrugarh district of Assam state in north-east India, and second is Digha–Sonpur Bridge over Ganges in Bihar.

The Godavari bridge is 4.1 kilometers (2.8 km Rail part & 4.1 km Road part) long consisting of 27 spans of 91.5 m and 7 spans of 45.72 m of which 6 spans of 45.72m are in 6 deg. curve at long Rajahmundry end to make up for the built up area. The bridge has a road deck over the single track rail deck, similar to the Grafton Bridge in New South Wales, Australia. This bridge, in addition to Godavari Arch Bridge, has been widely used to represent Rajahmundry in arts, media, and culture. It is one of the recognised symbols of Rajahmundry.

Geography

History

Construction
During the Third Five-Year plan doubling of railway track between Chennai-Howrah was planned. Most of the route had been doubled except the small stretch of track between Kovvur and Rajahmundry where a bridge had to be built to span the three kilometer long Godavari River. During 1964, the construction of second bridge across Godavari river at Rajahmundry was sanctioned as a part of doubling of track between Kovvur and Rajahmundry. But there had been a persistent demand from local population for construction of a road link between Kovvur and Rajahmundry, which would essentially link East Godavari and West Godavari districts. The Andhra Pradesh State Government came forward with the proposal to add a road deck over the rail bridge under construction as a part of doubling the railway track between Chennai-Howrah.

It was commissioned by South Central Railway division of Indian Railways. Construction of the bridge began in the early 1970s by Braithwaite, Burn & Jessop Construction Company, a group company of Bharat Bhari Udyog Nigam Limited. When completed it was Asia's longest rail -cum- road bridge.

It was inaugurated by the then President of India, Fakhruddin Ali Ahmed in 1974.

Sister bridges

Old Godavari bridge
The Old Godavari Bridge or Havelock Bridge was built in 1900 by Mr.F.T.G.Walton, now decommissioned, this bridge has 56 spans and is 2754 m long.  It was constructed with stone masonry and steel girders and certainly a marvel of British engineering. The New Godavari Bridge was made as a substitute for it.

Godavari arch bridge
Godavari Arch Bridge is the third bridge constructed near Rajahmundry. Constructed by the Hindustan Construction Company (HCC), this bridge is a modern-day engineering feat. The bridge is made of bow string girder arches. The bridge is fit for 350 km/h rail services. It was commissioned for passenger traffic in March 1997 and became fully operational for running trains by the Indian Railways from 2003.

Fourth Godavari bridge
New Kovvur–Rajahmundry 4th Bridge was opened to traffic in 2015.

Panorama

See also 
 List of road-rail bridges
 List of longest bridges in the world
 List of longest bridges above water in India

Gallery

References

Bridges in Andhra Pradesh
Bridges completed in 1977
1977 establishments in Andhra Pradesh
Truss bridges
Bridges over the Godavari river
Buildings and structures in Rajahmundry
Transport in Rajahmundry
Buildings and structures in West Godavari district
Transport in West Godavari district
Road bridges in India
Double-decker bridges
Road-rail bridges in India
20th-century architecture in India